Srikakula Andhra Maha Vishnu Katha is a 1966 Indian Telugu-language historical drama film, based on the life of Andhra Vishnu, produced by Daggubati Lakshminarayana Chowdary under the Sri Sambhu Films banner and directed by A. K. Sekhar. It stars N. T. Rama Rao and Jamuna, with music composed by Pendyala Nageswara Rao.

Cast
N. T. Rama Rao as Vallabha Devudu
Jamuna as Sujatha
S. V. Ranga Rao
Relangi as Sarvajett
Mudigonda Lingamurthy
Mikkilineni
M. Balaiah
Chadalavada
Girija as Makarika
Chaya Devi
L. Vijayalakshmi

Soundtrack

Music composed by Pendyala Nageswara Rao. Lyrics were written by Pingali Nagendra Rao.

References

External links 

 

1960s historical films
1960s biographical films
Indian historical films
Indian biographical films
Films scored by Pendyala Nageswara Rao
1960s Telugu-language films